SEAL Team 8: Behind Enemy Lines is a 2014 American action war film directed by Roel Reiné and starring Tom Sizemore. It is the fourth installment in the Behind Enemy Lines series. The film was released on direct-to-video and Blu-ray on April 1, 2014.

Plot
While on an unsanctioned covert mission in Africa, a small team of Navy SEALs uncovers intelligence pointing to the imminent sale of a massive quantity of weapons grade uranium. Now, with no mission prep and zero support, they have less than 36 hours to fight their way past a ruthless warlord's army guarding this secret mining operation, hidden deep in the treacherous Congo, in order to secure the yellowcake and expose the unknown buyer. As the story moves along, the asset that the SEAL team was asked to secure, turns out to be the warlord. With three of the team members lost and one taken by the adversaries, Case fights his way into their nest to save his teammate and give the enemy a withering end.

Cast
 Tom Sizemore as Ricks
 Lex Shrapnel as Case
 Anthony Oseyemi as Jay
 Michael Everson as Bubba
 Darron Meyer as Vic
 Aurélie Meriel as Zoe Jelani
 Colin Moss as Dan
 Langley Kirkwood as Lieutenant Parker
 Warrick Grier as Pat
 Tanya van Graan as Collins
 Bonnie Lee Bouman as Officer
 Eugene Wanangwa Khumbanyiwa as Arms Cache Manager

Production
The film takes place in Congo and was shot in South Africa.

Release
The film was released on April 1, 2014.

See also
 List of films featuring the United States Navy SEALs

References

External links
 
 

Behind Enemy Lines (film series)
20th Century Fox direct-to-video films
2010s action war films
2014 direct-to-video films
2014 films
American action war films
Films set in the Democratic Republic of the Congo
Films shot in South Africa
Films about United States Navy SEALs
American war adventure films
Direct-to-video sequel films
Films directed by Roel Reiné
2010s English-language films
2010s American films